Stelvio Rosi (1 August 1938 – 19 December 2018), also known as Stan Cooper, was an Italian film actor.

Life and career 
Born in Rome, Rosi made his film debut as a child actor in 1942, in Ferdinando Maria Poggioli's Yes, Madam. He reprised his acting career in the early 1960s and was initially used almost exclusively in teen comedies and musicarelli films. In 1968 he changed his image and his name and as Stan Cooper he was cast in the leading roles in a number of genre films, often adventure or war films. He worked several times with director José Luis Merino. In 1973 he retired from his acting career and moved to South America, where among other things he worked as a film and video producer in Rio de Janeiro.

Selected filmography 

 Eighteen in the Sun (1962) 
 Gli onorevoli (1963) 
 Non son degno di te (1965)
 Se non avessi più te (1965) 
 Soldati e caporali (1965) 
 Pensiero d'amore (1969) 
 Il suo nome è Donna Rosa (1969) 
 Battle of the Last Panzer (1969)  
 Mezzanotte d'amore (1970)
 More Dollars for the MacGregors (1970)
 Something Creeping in The Dark (1971)
 The Hanging Woman (1973)

References

External links  
 
 

1938 births  
20th-century Italian male actors
Italian male film actors 
Male actors from Rome
2018 deaths